Major James Allen David Woodhouse, 4th Baron Terrington (30 December 1915 – 6 May 1998) was a Baron in the Peerage of the United Kingdom and Deputy Chairman of Committees in the House of Lords. He was a member of the London Stock Exchange and a director of S J Carr and County (Gunmakers) Ltd. He served in the Royal Norfolk Regiment and Queen's Westminster Rifles and was wounded in World War II.

Woodhouse was the son of Horace Martin Woodhouse, 3rd Baron Terrington and Valerie Phillips, and was educated at Winchester College and then at Royal Military College, Sandhurst. He married Suzanne Irwin, daughter of Colonel Thomas Strutt Irwin, on 7 November 1942. They had three daughters.

On his death in 1998, having no male heirs, was succeeded by his brother, Montague Woodhouse, 5th Baron Terrington. James is depicted in three glass-plate negative photographs held by the National Portrait Gallery, two of which show him as a child.

Arms

References 

 Charles Mosley, editor Burke's Peerage, Baronetage & Knightage; 107th edition, 3 vols. (Wilmington, Delaware: Burke's Peerage (Genealogical Books) Ltd, 2003), vol. 3, p. 3874.

1915 births
1998 deaths
Barons in the Peerage of the United Kingdom
Royal Norfolk Regiment officers
King's Royal Rifle Corps officers
British Army personnel of World War II
People educated at Winchester College
Graduates of the Royal Military College, Sandhurst
Queen's Westminsters officers